Jiangmen Stadium (Simplified Chinese: 江门体育场) is a multi-use stadium in Jiangmen, China.  It is currently used mostly for football matches and was one of the six stadiums used for the 1991 FIFA Women's World Cup.  The stadium has a capacity of 13,000 people.

Footnotes

Football venues in China
1991 FIFA Women's World Cup stadiums
Sports venues in Guangdong